Amrit Lal Shrestha (25 December 1925 – 2 November 2003), better known as  Nati Kaji, was a Nepali singer and songwriter. Kaji was a prominent music director and singer of his time having composed and sung such evergreen songs as Nepali Hami (written by Madhav Prasad Ghimire).

Early life 
Natikaji was a nickname given to Amrit Lal Shrestha by his grandparents, and became the name he is known by throughout the country. He was born in 1925 at Pulchowk, Lalitpur. He lost his mother at the age of 5 and his father at the age of 10 and so was raised by his grandparents at Gujeshwori where his grandfather was the temple priest. Natikaji died on 2 November 2003.

Career 
Nati Kaji commenced his musical venture at age 7 when he started playing the harmonium at the Gujeshwori Bhajan Mandali. His professional music career initiated when he joined Radio Nepal in 1950. During the 40 years of his service in Radio Nepal, he composed over 2000 songs of varied genres. He is credited for over 15 operas, such as Pijada ko Suga, Kunjani, Prithvi Narayan Shah ka Char Pakchhya.
Marna Baru Garho Hunna, an evergreen song penned by Tirtha Raj Tuladhar, sung by Phatteman Rajbhandari remains one of his best compositions.

Recognition 
His awards include Gorkha Dakshin Bahu Pratham, Indra Rajya Laxmi Pragya Puraskar, Chinnalata Geet Puraskar and Bhupal Sangeet Puraskaramong.

Filmography

References

20th-century Nepalese male singers
1925 births
2003 deaths
Nepalese songwriters
People from Lalitpur District, Nepal